The Dub Room Special is an album by American musician Frank Zappa, released in August 2007. It is a soundtrack for the film of the same name, and combines recordings from a TV-show performance on August 27, 1974, and from a concert in New York City on October 31, 1981. The album, originally prepared for vinyl release by Zappa, was first sold at Zappa Plays Zappa shows in the United States during August 2007. Shortly thereafter, it became available for mail order.

Packaging 
Each copy of the CD contains a small souvenir piece of tape from Zappa's Utility Muffin Research Kitchen studio. The album has liner notes by John Frusciante.

Track listing 
All songs written by Frank Zappa.

Musicians

August 1974 band (tracks 1, 3-5 and 7-11) 
 Frank Zappa – guitar, vocals and percussion
 Napoleon Murphy Brock – flute, saxophone and vocals
 George Duke – keyboards and vocals
 Tom Fowler – bass
 Chester Thompson – drums
 Ruth Underwood – percussion

October 1981 band (tracks 2 and 6) 
 Frank Zappa – lead guitar and vocals
 Ray White – guitar and vocals
 Steve Vai – guitar and vocals
 Tommy Mars – keyboards and vocals
 Bobby Martin – keyboards, saxophone and vocals
 Scott Thunes – bass and vocals
 Chad Wackerman – drums
 Ed Mann – percussion and vocals

References 

Film soundtracks
Soundtracks published posthumously
Frank Zappa live albums
2007 live albums
2007 soundtrack albums
Zappa Records albums